No Place Like Earth is a collection of science fiction short stories by British writer John Wyndham, published in July 2003 by Darkside Press.

Contents
The collection contains the following short stories:
"Derelict of Space" (first published in Wanderers of Time)
 "Time to Rest" (also available in The Seeds of Time)
 "No Place Like Earth" (first published in Exiles on Asperus)
 "In Outer Space There Shone a Star"
 "But a Kind of a Ghost"
 "The Cathedral Crypt"
 "A Life Postponed"
 "Technical Slip" (previously published in Jizzle)
 "Una" (first published in Jizzle)
 "It's a Wise Child"
 "Pillar to Post" (first published in The Seeds of Time)
 "The Stare"
 "Time Stops Today"
 "The Meddler"
 "Blackmoil"
 "A Long Spoon" (first published in Consider Her Ways and Others)

See also 

There is a compilation of short science fiction stories published under the same title: John Carnell's No Place like Earth: A Science Fiction Anthology' (1954). It contains two stories by John Wyndham: No Place like Earth (as by John Beynon) and Survival.

External links 
 No Place like Earth at darksidepress.com

2003 short story collections
Short story collections by John Wyndham
Books published posthumously